Chrystia "Tia" Cabral (born May 18, 1991), known professionally as Spellling, is an American experimental pop musician based in Oakland, California. Cabral released her debut album, Pantheon of Me, in September 2017; Pitchfork felt it was "surely among the most overlooked debuts this calendar year". Signing to Sacred Bones Records in 2018, she followed up in February 2019 with Mazy Fly. It was met with universal acclaim by music critics, who enjoyed the dark and eerie qualities of Spellling's sound. Cabral released the third full-length Spellling album, The Turning Wheel, on June 25, 2021.

Early life
Cabral was born in Sacramento, California. She was raised in the Catholic Church, which would later influence her music.  

Cabral attended the University of California, Berkeley, studying philosophy for two semesters before changing her major to English literature after feeling "shamed out of the [philosophy] department" as the only femme person and person of color. She remained at Berkeley to pursue a Master of Fine Arts, which she completed in 2019.

Career
Cabral started her musical career in 2015, influenced by two events: watching a fellow San Francisco artist performing looped vocals; and the death of a close friend. At the time she was working as an elementary school teacher, and being around crayons inspired her to release a handmade CD called Crayola Church. Cabral said of the project: “I took a Crayola box and made a record based on every color in the box… I would wrap the CDs in children’s drawings and write the track listing, so some people have those [editions].”

In 2017, she self released her debut album, Pantheon of Me. In 2019, she released a follow-up, Mazy Fly, to positive reviews. In 2021, she released her third album, The Turning Wheel, to similarly positive reviews.

Artistry

Influences
When asked about her favorite albums, Cabral named Minnie Riperton's Come to My Garden, Kraftwerk's Computer World, and Iggy Pop's The Idiot.

Discography

Albums
 Pantheon of Me (2017)
 Mazy Fly (2019)
 The Turning Wheel (2021)

Singles
 "Hard to Please" (2018)
 "Little Deer" (2021)
 "Boys at School" (2021)
 "Turning Wheel" (2021)

References

Further reading
 Emma Silvers. "SPELLLING Is Making Haunted Electronic Pop for the Witch (or Wizard) in All of Us". Pitchfork. February 15, 2019.
 Ahn Lee. "SPELLLING on Friendship". Department of Art Practice, UC Berkeley. May 3, 2021.

External links
 Spellling at Bandcamp
 Spellling at Sacred Bones Records

American experimental musicians
Living people
American women singers
Experimental pop musicians
American electronic musicians
American women pop singers
Women in electronic music
21st-century African-American women singers
University of California, Berkeley alumni
1991 births